Alexandrina may refer to:

Alexandrina (name), a female name
Lakes:
Lake Alexandrina (South Australia)
Lake Alexandrina, New Zealand
Alexandrina Council, a local government area covering land on the west side of Lake Alexandrina in South Australia
Bibliotheca Alexandrina
Alexandrina (Александрына), a song by Belarusian band Pesnyary

See also
Alexandrine (disambiguation)